Cambridge Movement may refer to:

 Cambridge movement (philosophy), a school of thought closely related to the Oxford Movement
 Cambridge movement (civil rights), a social and political movement in Cambridge, Maryland